Partido Socialista Independiente may refer to:

 Independent Socialist Party (Bolivia)
 Independent Socialist Party (1944), also in Bolivia
 Also Spain (defunct)